Maggie Ford, also known as Elizabeth Lord (born 1928) was a British writer.

Early life and family 
Maggie Ford was born Ivy May Lord in London, England in 1928. She became interested in writing when she retired from her full time job and wrote her first novel at the age of sixty six.

Her first husband died In 1954, from a tragic accident at work. She re-married and then started a nursery / garden centre with her second husband.

Career
Her writing career started when she wrote an article for Weekend magazine about a robbery that happened when she was at home with her daughter.

In the 1970s, she started writing romantic stories for various magazines.

In 1994, she published her first novel, Stolen Years.

Her first historical romantic work Company of Rebels, published in 2004, has sold in the United Kingdom and the United States.

In 2006, her next romantic fiction novel, Give Me Tomorrow, was published. Later, Publishers Weekly reviewed the novel.

In 2013, her novel, The Soldier's Bride, was published which was later reviewed by Burnley Express.

In 2014, her novel, Call Nurse Jenny, was published. The novel was reviewed by Blackpool Gazette.

During her writing career, she was a member of Brentwood Writers' Circle, Billericay Arts Group as well as the Romanic Novelist Association.

Bibliography 
 Lord, Elizabeth (1994). Stolen Years 
 Lord, Elizabeth (1995). The Angry Heart
 Lord, Elizabeth (1996). A Better Life
 Lord, Elizabeth (1997). The Turning Tides
 Lord, Elizabeth (1998). For All the Bright Promise
 Lord, Elizabeth (1999). The Bowmaker Girls
 Lord, Elizabeth (2000). Mile End Girl
 Lord, Elizabeth (2001). Brenda's Place
 Lord, Elizabeth (2001). Butterfly Summers
 Lord, Elizabeth. Shadow's of Honour
 Lord, Elizabeth (2002). From Bow to Bond Street
 Lord, Elizabeth (2002). Autumn Skies
 Lord, Elizabeth (2002). Shadow of the Protector
 Lord, Elizabeth (2002). Fortunes Daughter
 Lord, Elizabeth (2004). Company of Rebels
 Lord, Elizabeth (2004). The Flower Girl
 Lord, Elizabeth (2006). Give Me Tomorrow
 Lord, Elizabeth (2006). To Cast a Stone
 Lord, Elizabeth (2006). Winter Wine
 Lord, Elizabeth (2007). A Secret Inheritance
 Lord, Elizabeth (2009). Julia's Way
 Lord, Elizabeth (2010). All That We Are
 Lord, Elizabeth (2012). The Chandelier Ballroom
 Lord, Elizabeth (2013). Illusions of Happiness
 Ford, Maggie (2013). The Soldier's Bride
 Ford, Maggie (2014). A Mother's Love
 Ford, Maggie (2014). Call Nurse Jenny
 Ford, Maggie (2014). A Woman's Place
 Ford, Maggie (2015). The Factory Girl
 Ford, Maggie (2016). A Girl in Wartime
 Ford, Maggie (2016). A Soldier's Girl
 Ford, Maggie (2017). An East End Girl
 Ford, Maggie (2018). The Fisherman's Girl
 Ford, Maggie (2019). Rags to Riches
 Ford, Maggie (2020). The Rag and Bone Girl
 Ford, Maggie (2021). The Flower Girl
 Ford, Maggie (2021). A Brighter Tomorrow
 Ford, Maggie (2021). A Fall from Grace
 Ford, Maggie (2021). A New Dream
 Ford, Maggie (2021). One of the Family
 Ford, Maggie (2021). Affairs of the Heart
 Ford, Maggie (2021). Echoes of the Past
 Ford, Maggie (2022). Mile End Girl
 Ford, Maggie (2022). A New Dream
 Ford, Maggie (2022). A Brighter Tomorrow
 Ford, Maggie (2022). A Fall From Grace

References

1928 births
2020 deaths
20th-century British women writers
21st-century British women writers
Writers from London